Veronika Marchenko may refer to:

Veronika Marchenko (activist), Russian activist
Veronika Marchenko (archer), Ukrainian archer